Knatchbull is a surname. The surname Knatchbull has the meaning "knock out the bull", i.e. butcher.
 
Notable people with the surname include:

 Adrian Knatchbull-Hugessen
 Alexandra Knatchbull
 Daisy Knatchbull
 Dora Knatchbull, married name of Dora Bright (1862–1951), English composer and pianist
 Doreen Knatchbull, Baroness Brabourne
 Edward Knatchbull (disambiguation), various people
 Edward Knatchbull-Hugessen, 1st Baron Brabourne
 John Knatchbull, 7th Baron Brabourne
 Leonora Knatchbull
 Michael Knatchbull
 Michael Knatchbull, 5th Baron Brabourne
 Nicholas Knatchbull
 Norton Knatchbull (disambiguation), various people
 Patricia Knatchbull, 2nd Countess Mountbatten of Burma

Notes